Trish Thuy Trang (born December 15, 1980) is a Vietnamese American singer and songwriter.

Biography

Early life and career
Trish Thuy Trang (born Nguyễn Thùy Trang) was born in Saigon, Vietnam, on December 15, 1980. Growing up, Trang was already familiar with American music styles as a result of listening to artists such as Madonna, Mariah Carey and Sheryl Crow. As a result, her music can best be described as a mix of Asian pop, western pop, and R&B. Her parents saw the passion she had for music and encouraged her to take piano lessons, which later evolved into discovering Trang’s natural affinity for singing - a discovery that would ultimately result in the opportunity of a lifetime with Asia Entertainment.

After seeing Trang’s vocal talents in various karaoke sessions, friends encouraged her to send a demo to Asia Entertainment. Amazed at how fluidly she was able to transition between English and Vietnamese, Asia Entertainment signed her.

Trang writes and produces a majority of her own music. She appears on Asia Entertainment videos for the Vietnamese music community and collaborates with Asia Entertainment and Triple T Productions for CD productions. Trish Thuy Trang is one of the first Vietnamese singers to appear on iTunes, where her fourth CD Trish can be downloaded. Her fifth album, entitled Shades of Blue, was released in April 2008. Her 6th album, entitled "Whispers," was released in 2010.

Personal life

In October 2010, Trish and her fiancé Nghia were married in a Buddhist ceremony and in 2012 welcomed their first child, a son named Nio. On her Facebook page, she explained that "His name is Buddhist and means the guardian of Buddha and protector of cherished values and beliefs against evil."

In January 2014, Trish announced that she was again pregnant, this time with a daughter, and posted ultrasound imagery of the baby on her Facebook page. On May 31, 2014 her daughter Melodi was born.

Trish is also the founder of baby wear company, Scabib.

Discography

Albums 
 Don't Know Why (1998)
 I'll Dream of You (1999)
 Siren (2002)
 Trish (2005)
 Shades of Blue (2008)
 Whispers (2010)

Singles 
 Secret Place
 Without a Trace

Compilations 
 The Best of Trish 1 (2001)
 The Best of Trish 2 (2004)

Collaborations 
 Waiting for You (2003)
 Merry Christmas (2006) (collaboration album with Asia 4)

DVDs 
 The Best of Trish - All My Favorite Songs (Video and Karaoke)
 Trish DVD Video: 2 Hours Special
 Trish MTV DVD - Ever After

References

External links 
 
 Official website store

1980 births
Living people
People from Ho Chi Minh City
American women pop singers
Vietnamese emigrants to the United States
21st-century Vietnamese women singers
21st-century American women singers
21st-century American singers